Thomas Fane may refer to:

Thomas Fane (died 1607), MP for Dover
Sir Thomas Fane (died 1589) (c. 1510–1589), Wyatt rebel, High Sheriff of Kent and MP
Sir Thomas Fane (died 1692) (1626–1692), member of parliament for Maidstone
Thomas Fane, 6th Earl of Westmorland (1681–1736), British peer
Thomas Fane, 8th Earl of Westmorland (1701–1771), British MP for Lyme Regis and a lord commissioner of trade
Thomas Fane (died 1807) (1760–1807), member of parliament for Lyme Regis